Uudeküla Bulldogs RFC is an Estonian rugby club based in the village of Uudeküla in Tamsalu Parish.

History
The club was founded in 2007.

Estonian rugby union teams
Rugby clubs established in 2007
Tapa Parish